Ponzano Romano is a  (municipality) in the Metropolitan City of Rome in the Italian region of Latium, located about  north of Rome.

Ponzano Romano borders the following municipalities: Civita Castellana, Civitella San Paolo, Collevecchio, Filacciano, Forano, Nazzano, Sant'Oreste, Stimigliano.

Demographic evolution

References

Cities and towns in Lazio